Iqbal Khan (born February 13, 1957) is the founding board member and chief executive officer of Fajr Capital, and a member of the board of directors of Jadwa Investment in Saudi Arabia, Bank Islam Brunei Darussalam in Brunei and MENA Infrastructure Fund.

Khan was previously the founding chief executive officer of HSBC Amanah. He simultaneously served as a board member of HSBC Bank Middle East, the Saudi British Bank, and HSBC Investment Bank in the Middle East and Saudi Arabia.

Early life
Born in India in 1957, Khan has a master's degree in political science and international relations and a B.Sc. (Hons) in physics and chemistry, both from Aligarh Muslim University. He further obtained an Advanced Management qualification from INSEAD as well as a professional qualification from NASD, New York.

2012 Royal Award for Islamic Finance
In September 2012, Khan was presented The Royal Award For Islamic Finance, by His Majesty Tuanku Abdul Halim Mu’adzam Shah, the King of Malaysia.  The award selection criteria focused on both qualitative and quantitative aspects to honour Khan's contribution to the global development of Islamic finance in the areas of financial innovation; exceptional leadership and vision; serving as an inspiration; and influencing the future progress and development of the Islamic finance industry.

References

Living people
1957 births
Saudi Arabian bankers
Saudi Arabian chief executives